Tribulopis is a genus of flowering plants belonging to the family Zygophyllaceae.

Its native range is Australia.

Species:
 Tribulopis angustifolia R.Br. 
 Tribulopis bicolor F.Muell.

References

Tribuloideae
Rosid genera